The 2020  Vitality Blast was the 2020 season of the t20 Blast, a professional Twenty20 cricket league being played in England and Wales. It was the third season in which the domestic T20 competition, run by the England and Wales Cricket Board (ECB), which was branded as the Vitality Blast due to the tournament's sponsorship deal. On 12 August 2020, following a delay due to the COVID-19 pandemic, the ECB confirmed the fixtures for the tournament.

In the North Group, the Notts Outlaws and Lancashire Lightning qualified for the quarter-finals. In the Central Group, Gloucestershire became the first team to qualify. The South Group saw Surrey and Kent Spitfires qualify. Following the conclusion of the group stage, the Northants Steelbacks, the Leicestershire Foxes and the Sussex Sharks had also confirmed their spots in the quarter-finals.

Surrey, Lancashire Lightning and Gloucestershire all won their quarter-final matches to progress to Finals Day. The match between the Leicestershire Foxes and the Notts Outlaws finished in a tie. The Notts Outlaws advanced to Finals Day after they had scored more runs in the powerplay.

For the first time in the tournament's history, Finals Day was washed out, with all the matches rescheduled to be played on 4 October 2020, the designated reserve day. If no play was possible on the reserve day, the ECB announced that the matches would have been played on 7 October 2020. Play was delayed further on the reserve day due to rain, and as a result the two semi-finals were reduced to 11 overs per side, and the final was shortened to 16 overs per side. Surrey beat Gloucestershire by six wickets in the first semi-final, and the Notts Outlaws beat Lancashire Lightning by five wickets in the second semi-final. In the final, the Notts Outlaws beat Surrey by six wickets to win the tournament and their second domestic T20 title.

Background
The tournament was scheduled to start on 28 May 2020, and finish on 5 September 2020. However, on 24 April 2020, due to the COVID-19 pandemic, the England and Wales Cricket Board (ECB) confirmed that no professional cricket would be played in England before 1 July 2020. In late May 2020, the ECB looked at the scheduling of domestic cricket for the summer, with the t20 Blast likely to go ahead, including the traditional Final's Day at Edgbaston. The ECB also confirmed that no domestic cricket would be played before 1 August 2020. On 29 June 2020, the ECB confirmed that the county cricket season would begin on 1 August 2020, with the format agreed in early July.

On 7 July 2020, the majority of counties voted to start the tournament on 27 August 2020, with Finals Day taking place at Edgbaston on 3 October 2020.

Teams
The teams were placed into the following groups. The top two teams in each group progressed to the quarter-finals, where they were joined by the two best third-placed teams:

 North Group: Derbyshire Falcons, Durham, Lancashire Lightning, Leicestershire Foxes, Notts Outlaws, Yorkshire Vikings
 Central Group: Birmingham Bears, Glamorgan, Gloucestershire, Northants Steelbacks, Somerset, Worcestershire Rapids
 South Group: Essex Eagles, Hampshire, Kent Spitfires, Middlesex, Surrey, Sussex Sharks

Fixtures

North Group

Central Group

South Group

 Surrey's score of 218 was a record high total for a T20 match at Lord's

Standings

Central Group

North Group

South Group

Knock-out stage

Quarter-finals

Finals Day

Semi-finals

Final

References

External links
 Series home at ESPN Cricinfo

T20 Blast
T20 Blast
T20 Blast